Canice Maher (born 1991) is an Irish former hurler. At club level he played with St Martin's and St Jude's. Maher lined out at inter-county level with both the Kilkenny and Dublin senior hurling teams.

Career

Maher first came to hurling prominence as a member of the Castlecomer Community School team that won the Leinster Colleges Championship in 2007. He simultaneously lined out with the St Martin's club at juvenile and underage levels before eventually progressing onto the club's senior team. Maher first appeared on the inter-county scene as a member of the Kilkenny minor hurling team that beat Galway in the 2008 All-Ireland minor final before later captaining the team in his second and final season. 

Maher was also a member of the extended panel of the Kilkenny under-21 hurling team that lost out to Clare in the 2012 All-Ireland under-21 final, having earlier lined out for the senior team in the 2011 Walsh Cup. After transferring to the St Jude's club, Maher also earned selection to the Dublin senior hurling team. He later joined the East Cavan Gaels club and made his Cavan senior hurling team debut in 2022.

Honours

Castlecomer Community School
Leinster Colleges Senior Hurling Championship: 2007

Kilkenny
Leinster Under-21 Hurling Championship: 2012
All-Ireland Minor Hurling Championship: 2008 
Leinster Minor Hurling Championship: 2008, 2009 (c)

References

1991 births
Living people
St Martin's (Kilkenny) hurlers
St Jude's hurlers
East Cavan Gaels hurlers
Kilkenny inter-county hurlers
Dublin inter-county hurlers
Cavan inter-county hurlers
Hurling forwards